Christopher Michael Thompson (born 7 February 1982) is an English former professional footballer, who played as a striker.

He notably played in the Football League for Grimsby Town, before moving into Non-League football with Northwich Victoria, Droylsden, Leek Town, Chorley, Scarborough, Barrow, Fleetwood Town, Leigh Genesis and Bamber Bridge.

Career
Thompson joined Liverpool as a youngster but was released in 2001 despite being the club's reserve team top scorer during the 2000/2001 season. Thompson made his debut for his new club Grimsby Town, coming on as a substitute in the 74th minute, at home to Norwich City, in a 2–0 defeat in the First Division on 30 October 2001. He made fourteen league appearances for Grimsby, scoring one goal. In 2003, he moved to Northwich Victoria where he scored three goal in 27 league appearances. He spent time on loan at Droylsden and Leek Town before moving to Chorley in 2005 and the following season to Scarborough, where he scored sixteen goals in the 2006-07 season. Later in 2007 he moved to Barrow, then in the Conference North, where he was a member of the squad that won promotion through the end-of-season play-offs to the Conference National in 2007-08, scoring sixteen goals. On 5 September 2008 he signed a one-month loan deal with Conference North club Fleetwood Town, where he played in one league match and one Conference League Cup match.

Honours

Barrow
Conference North play-off final winner: 2007-08

References

External links
 (Before Barrow)
 (Barrow onward)

1982 births
Living people
English footballers
Liverpool F.C. players
Grimsby Town F.C. players
Northwich Victoria F.C. players
Droylsden F.C. players
Leek Town F.C. players
Chorley F.C. players
Scarborough F.C. players
Barrow A.F.C. players
Bamber Bridge F.C. players
Fleetwood Town F.C. players
English Football League players
National League (English football) players
Northern Premier League players
Warrington Town F.C. players
Leigh Genesis F.C. players
Salford City F.C. players
Association football forwards